Nayar or Nayyar is a surname that is found among Khatri community which are majorly Hindus with a minority of Sikhs and Muslims. The belong to the "Sareen" division among the Khatris. They were mostly concentrated in the Majha region especially in the districts of Gujrat, Lahore, Okara, Nankana Sahib and Sialkot before 1947. Nayyar families were known to have been qanungos (governors) in the town of Kunjah in Gujrat district, Punjab.

As a custom, milk is never churned in Nayyar families because one of their ancestors died of drinking whey in which a snake had got accidentally churned.

Notable people
 A. Nayyar (born 1950), Pakistani singer
 Abdul Hameed Nayyar (born 1945), Pakistani nuclear physicist and activist
 Abhishek Nayar (born 1983), Indian first-class cricketer
 Ankur Nayyar (born 1967), Indian actor
 Anuj Nayyar (1975–1999), Indian army officer
 Deepak Nayyar (born 1946), Professor of Economics
 Dewan Mokham Chand Nayyar (1750-1814), General of the Sikh Empire, as well as his son Dewan Moti Ram (1770-1837) and grandsons Dewan Kirpa Ram (d. 1843) and Dewan Ram Dayal (d. 1820).
 Kuldip Nayar (born 1923), Indian journalist
 Kunal Nayyar (born 1981), Indian-American actor
 Nayyar Ali Dada (born 1943), Pakistani architect
 Nayyar Ejaz, Pakistani actor
 Nayyar Kamal (born 1953), Pakistani television actress
 O. P. Nayyar (1926–2007), Indian film music director
 Pyarelal Nayyar (1899–1982), her brother and Gandhi's other secretary
 Shree K. Nayar, engineer and computer scientist
 Suhail Nayyar, (b. 1989), Indian, Bollywood Actor.
 Sushila Nayyar (1914–2000), Mahatma Gandhi's personal secretary and physician
 Falguni Nayar (born 1963), founder, CEO, Nykaa

See also
 Nayar (disambiguation)

References 

Indian surnames
Surnames of Indian origin
Punjabi-language surnames
Hindu surnames
Khatri clans
Khatri surnames